Upsete Station is a railway station on the Bergen Line located at Upsete in Aurland, Norway. The station is served by the Bergen Commuter Rail, operated by Vy Tog, with up to five daily departures in each direction. The station was opened in 1908 as part of the Bergen Line. The surrounding area is dominantly recreational, with many cabins.

External links
 Jernbaneverket's page on Upsete

Railway stations in Aurland
Railway stations on Bergensbanen
Railway stations opened in 1908
1908 establishments in Norway